St Bede's Catholic Voluntary Academy (formerly St Bede's Catholic School) is a mixed Roman Catholic secondary school located in Scunthorpe, North Lincolnshire, England.

History
Work on the £100,000 school was meant to start September 1956. The foundation stone laid by the Bishop of Nottingham, Edward Ellis, in June 1960. It would open in September 1961 for 360 children. £70,000 was paid for the school, by parishioners, with the rest by Lindsey Education Committee - for the canteen, dining room, medical inspection room, and playing fields. Children came from Brigg and St Norbert in Crowle.

Previously a voluntary aided school administered by North Lincolnshire Council, St Bede's Catholic School was converted to academy status on 1 April 2012 and was renamed St Bede's Catholic Voluntary Academy. The school forms part of the Northern Lincolnshire Catholic Academy Trust which is supported by the Roman Catholic Diocese of Nottingham.

Curriculum
St Bede's Catholic Voluntary Academy offers GCSEs and BTECs as programmes of study for pupils.

References

External links
St Bede's Catholic Voluntary Academy official website

Academies in the Borough of North Lincolnshire
Catholic secondary schools in the Diocese of Nottingham
Educational institutions established in 1961
1961 establishments in England
Schools in Scunthorpe
Secondary schools in the Borough of North Lincolnshire